The Yercaud day gecko (Cnemaspis yercaudensis) is a species of gecko found in the Shevaroy Hills of southern India.

Its type locality is Yercaud Town (11°48'N; 78°14'E), in the Shevaroyan (Shevaroy) Range, Salem District, Tamil Nadu, southwest India, with its habitat located some 1515m above sea level.

References

 Das, I & A. M. Bauer 2000 Two new species of Cnemaspis (Sauria: Gekonidae) from Tamil Nadu, southern India. Russ. J. Herpetol. 7 (1): 17-28

yercaudensis
Reptiles described in 2000